The Arfak rainbowfish (Melanotaenia arfakensis) is a species of rainbowfish in the subfamily Melanotaeniinae. It is endemic to West Papua in Indonesia. Its natural habitat is rivers. It is threatened by habitat loss. It grows to a length of about 8 cm.

References

Arfak rainbowfish
Freshwater fish of Western New Guinea
Fish described in 1990
Taxonomy articles created by Polbot